Antiphilosophy is an opposition to traditional philosophy. It may be characterized as anti-theoretical, critical of a priori justifications, and may see common philosophical problems as misconceptions that are to be dissolved. Common strategies may involve forms of relativism, skepticism, nihilism, or pluralism.

The term has been used as a denigrating word but is also used with more neutral or positive connotations. Boris Groys's 2012 book Introduction to Antiphilosophy discusses thinkers such as Kierkegaard, Shestov, Nietzsche, and Benjamin, characterizing their work as privileging life and action over thought.

Examples of antiphilosophical positions

Ethics
The antiphilosopher could argue that, with regard to ethics, there is only practical, ordinary reasoning. Therefore, it is wrong to a priori superimpose overarching ideas of what is good for philosophical reasons. For example, it is wrong to blanketly assume that only happiness matters, as in utilitarianism. This is not to say though that some utilitarian-like argument can't be valid when it comes to what is right in some particular case.

Continuum hypothesis
Consider the continuum hypothesis, stating that there is no set with size strictly between the size of the natural numbers and the size of the real numbers. One idea is that the set universe ought to be rich, with many sets, which leads to the continuum hypothesis being false. This richness argument, the antiphilosopher might argue, is purely philosophical, and groundless, and therefore should be dismissed; maintaining that the continuum hypothesis should be settled by mathematical arguments. In particular it could be the case that the question isn't mathematically meaningful or useful, that the hypothesis is neither true, nor false. It is then wrong to stipulate, a priori and for philosophical reasons, that the continuum hypothesis is true or false.

Antiphilosophies

Wittgenstein's metaphilosophy

The views of Ludwig Wittgenstein, specifically his metaphilosophy, could be said to be antiphilosophy. In The New York Times, Paul Horwich points to Wittgenstein's rejection of philosophy as traditionally and currently practiced and his "insistence that it can't give us the kind of knowledge generally regarded as its raison d'être".

Horwich goes on to argue that:

Horwich concludes that, according to Wittgenstein,
philosophy "must avoid theory-construction and instead be merely 'therapeutic,' confined to exposing the irrational assumptions on which theory-oriented investigations are based and the irrational conclusions to which they lead".

Moreover, these antiphilosophical views are central to Wittgenstein, Horwich argues.

Pyrrhonism
Pyrrhonism has been considered an antiphilosophy.

See also
 Church's thesis as a definition is an example of a problem where misconceptions may be dissolved, by viewing the thesis as nothing but a normal mathematical definition.
 Quietism also takes a therapeutic approach to philosophy.
 Non-philosophy

Notes

References

Further reading
 Paul Horwich, Wittgenstein's Metaphilosophy, Oxford University Press, 2012.
 Ludwig Wittgenstein, Philosophical Investigations, 1953.

Philosophical schools and traditions
Metaphilosophy
Ludwig Wittgenstein
Skepticism